Laurent Novikoff (1888 – June 18, 1956) or Laurent Novikov, was a Russian ballet dancer who became a citizen of the United States in 1939.

Biography
He graduated from Moscow's Bolshoi Ballet School in 1906. He danced with Diaghilev in 1909 and again in 1919–1921; and Pavlova's company from 1911–1914 and again in 1921–1928. He became the ballet master at the Chicago Opera, from 1929–1933, He danced at the Metropolitan Opera in New York City from 1941-1945.

He opened up a ballet school in New Buffalo, Michigan, and died there in 1956.

References

External links

1888 births
1956 deaths
Emigrants from the Russian Empire to the United States
Moscow State Academy of Choreography alumni